Noam Dar (born 28 July 1993) is an Israeli-Scottish professional wrestler. He is currently signed to WWE, and is a record setting two-time NXT UK Heritage Cup Champion. He also wrestles for Scottish promotion Insane Championship Wrestling (ICW).

Dar first competed for WWE in the 2016 Cruiserweight Classic, and is the first Israeli professional wrestler to perform for the company. He has also worked for Total Nonstop Action Wrestling (TNA) and on its British Boot Camp series, as well as Progress Wrestling, Preston City Wrestling (PCW), Dragon Gate UK (DGUK), Revolution Pro Wrestling (RPW), Westside Xtreme Wrestling (wXw), Global Force Wrestling (GFW), and Ring of Honor (ROH). He is a two-time ICW Zero-G Champion, a one-time PCW Cruiserweight Champion, and a one-time ICW World Heavyweight Champion, among other championships and accomplishments.

Early life
Noam Dar was born in Be'er Ya'akov on 28 July 1993. He moved with his family to Scotland at the age of five and was raised in Ayr, where he became a supporter of the football team Rangers FC.

Professional wrestling career

Independent circuit (2008–2016) 
Dar debuted on the British independent circuit at the age of 15, working for Scottish promotions such as British Championship Wrestling and Premiere British Wrestling. Dar would get his first international experience wrestling in Spain for Dragon Gate's "European Invasion" and Zero1 Spain, with winning efforts over Colin McKaye and Sean South, respectively.

On 1 May 2011, Dar captured his first championship by becoming one half of the Premier British Wrestling (PBW) Tag Team Champions with Liam Thomson, holding the titles for over 11 months, with six title defenses, before losing them to the team of Lionheart and Wolfgang.

Dar entered a tournament to become the One Pro Wrestling 1PW World Heavyweight Champion in February 2011; he was unsuccessful but later that year went on to become the final 1PW Openweight Champion, winning the vacant title in a four-way match with Marty Scurll, Kris Travis and Joey Hayes and successfully defending it against Bad Bones and Kid Kash at 1PW's final show.

In October 2011, Dar worked a dark match for Dragon Gate UK's "Yosuka vs Shingo 3" event, in a winning effort against Daniel Robert.

Dar finished 2011 with another trip overseas, scoring a win over MK McKinnan for Westside Xtreme Wrestling (wXw), which qualified him to return in 2012 to compete in a series of matches at the wXw 16 Carat Gold 2012 shows.

In 2011, Dar began working higher profile matches, challenging multiple times for the BCW Heavyweight and Openweight Championships, albeit unsuccessfully and wrestling bigger name opponents such as Eddie Edwards for IPW, continuing the feud into 2012. For the Revolution Pro Wrestling promotion, Dar wrestled Jerry Lynn and challenged Prince Devitt for the RPW Cruiserweight Championship. Dar entered the SWE Speed King Championship tournament, qualifying for the finals with a win over Spud but failing to capture the championship. Dar competed unsuccessfully in two tournaments for IPW, losing to Sami Callihan in a Quarter Finals match for the IPW:UK Cruiserweight Championship and a first round loss to Zack Sabre Jr. in a tournament to crown the first British National Champion.

In April 2012, Dar began competing for Lionheart's Pro Wrestling Elite promotion, debuting with a win over Mark Haskins, before a loss to AJ Styles. Dar was entered into a tournament to crown a PWE World Heavyweight Champion, defeating El Ligero and Mikey Whiplash before losing to Andy Wild in the finals.

Dar captured the PBW "King of Cruisers 2012" crown in a six-way match to finish a successful year in the promotion.

2013 saw Dar return to Dragon Gate UK, working a series of matches against Yamato, Jimmy Susumu and Masaaki Mochizuki.

RPW invited Dar back for a run of shows which saw him defeat Mark Andrews in his return, but lose contests to Michael Elgin and Marty Scurll.

Dar ended 2013 by finally capturing the BCW Openweight Championship from Andy Wild, Dar would hold the championship for well over a year before losing it to Kenny Williams in April 2015. Dar was granted a rematch for the title against Williams in a triple threat also involving Will Ospreay but Williams retained.

Between 2014 and 2015, Dar had a three match feud with Grado over the PWE World Heavyweight Championship, where Dar first scored a disqualification victory, in a subsequent rematch they wrestled to a no-contest before Grado was finally victorious in a third defense, ending their feud. During this period, Dar also scored a notable win over Christopher Daniels.

In late 2015, Dar debuted for Global Force Wrestling (GFW), defeating Chris Ridgeway.

As a result of winning PWE's "Elite Rumble", Dar received another shot at the PWE World Heavyweight Championship. Dar succeeded in dethroning Iestyn Rees for the title on 23 July 2016 at PWE's "Five Year Anniversary: Dar Wars – The Final Episode" Show.

Insane Championship Wrestling (2010–2016, 2019–present) 
Dar debuted in Insane Championship Wrestling (ICW) with a win over The Highlander before winning a tournament to become the inaugural ICW Zero-G Champion. Dar held the title for 266 days (the longest reign in the title's history) before losing it to Lionheart. Dar won the championship back less than two months later to become the first two-time ICW Zero-G Champion. Dar's second reign would last 252 days, where he was defeated by Andy Wilde.

In 2012, Dar would challenge unsuccessfully for both the ICW Tag Team Titles and ICW Heavyweight Championship.

From 2013 to 2015, Dar would continue his pursuit of championships in ICW, he challenged subsequent champions Mark Coffey, Wolfgang, Kenny Williams, and Stevie Boy unsuccessfully to regain the ICW Zero-G Championship and began teaming with Kenny Williams as Champagne Superbollocks to challenge Polo Promotions for the ICW Tag Team Championships on two occasions, one (swiftly interrupted) no-contest and one loss. However, following a Best of Five series with Joe Coffey where Dar was bested 3-2 and a lengthy feud with ICW authority figure Red Lightning, Dar would end 2015 on a high in ICW by defeating Joe Hendry in an ICW World Heavyweight Championship No.1 Contender match and gaining a win over former two-time champion Drew Galloway.

Dar remained prominent in ICW throughout 2016, entering the 30-man Square Go! match and challenging for the Zero-G Championship in addition to wins over Doug Williams, Sha Samuels and Liam Thomson. Dar was in one of the three main-events of ICW's debut iPPV Shug's Hoose Party 3 teaming with Sha Samuels and Grado as "Team Mark Dallas" to defeat The Black Label (Drew Galloway, Jack Jester and Wolfgang), thus restoring 50% of ICW ownership to Mark Dallas.

Due to signing with WWE, Dar's final ICW match was against Andy Wilde on 11 September 2016. Dar lost before giving a farewell speech and receiving an ovation from the crowd and ICW roster.

Dar returned to ICW for one night only on 29 July 2017 for Shug's Hoose Party 4, Night One, tagging with Sha Samuels in a winning effort against Joe Coffey and Bram.

On 11 November 2018, it was announced Dar would make a further appearance at ICW Fear and Loathing XI, teaming with Wolfgang and BT Gunn against British Strong Style.
Dar returned to ICW on Night Two of Fear & Loathing XII, and defeated Kieran Kelly & Leyton Buzzard in a triple threat match. After said match, Dar was interviewed and announced that he will be returning to ICW on a full-time basis, along with competing on NXT UK, due to WWE's Global Expansion and partnership with ICW. In the main event of ICW's 9th Annual Square Go! Event, Noam Dar defeated Stevie Xavier to capture the ICW World Heavyweight Title for the first time, something he never managed to do in his first stint with the promotion. Dar is the first ICW World Heavyweight Champion of non-British descent, being born in Israel to an Israeli father.

Preston City Wrestling (2011–2016) 
Dar debuted in Preston City Wrestling (PCW) in 2011, fighting his way to finals of a tournament to crown the first PCW Heavyweight Champion before being bested by T-Bone. However, Dar would remain in title contention and in 2012 he became the inaugural PCW Cruiserweight Champion, holding the championship for 168 days before losing the title to Dave Rayne in 2013.

Dar bounced back into title contention by winning the 2013 "Road to Glory" tournament, with wins over CJ Banks, Brian Kendrick and Joey Hayes. The tournament win earned him another shot at the PCW Heavyweight Championship. Cashing in his title opportunity, he wrestled champion Doug Williams to a time-limit draw, before challenging later champion Lionheart in a losing effort. Dar rounded up 2013 with a loss to Doug Williams, a victory over Johnny Gargano and a Tag Team loss to both Williams and Lionheart where Dar was teamed with Uhaa Nation.

Following the championship loss, Dar would remain a prominent figure in PCW in 2014 and 2015, wrestling established names like Paul London, Steve Corino, Chris Hero, Tommaso Ciampa, John Morrison and Rob Van Dam. Dar had a violent three match feud with former WWE star Drew Galloway, which Dar won 2:1.

Due to a working relationship between PCW and Ring of Honor (ROH), Dar has competed on a number of ROH/PCW "Supershows", wrestling the likes of Cedric Alexander, Adam Cole, Roderick Strong, Bobby Fish and A. C. H. – as well as challenging Jay Lethal for the ROH World Championship.

Dar entered the 2016 "Road to Glory" tournament, eliminating Timothy Thatcher and El Ligero but eliminated in the semi-finals by Drew Galloway. In March 2016, Dar wrestled Jeff Jarrett in a losing effort for the PCW vs GFW "Global Conflict" show. Dar would begin a climb up the card following this loss, with wins over Phillip Michaels, John Morrison and PCW Heavyweight Champion Sha Samuels, in a match originally billed as a championship contest, reversed to a non-title match by GM Joanna Rose following his victory.

Dar was a surprise addition to the main-event of "Tribute to the Troops 3" iPPV on 25 June 2016, defeating Drew Galloway and Sha Samuels to win the PCW Heavyweight Championship. He retained the title twice in one night on 6 August 2016 at the "Fifth Anniversary" iPPV, defeating Samuels in a rematch and "Road to Glory" 2016 winner and current PCW Tag Team Champion Rampage Brown, respectively. Dar again retained the PCW Heavyweight Championship on September 3, 2016, at PCW "Collision Course".

Progress Wrestling (2012–2015) 
Dar competed at the first Progress Wrestling show in 2012, entering a tournament to become the inaugural Progress Champion, he was unsuccessful in the tournament but then began a winning streak that would last the remainder of the year and continue into 2013 when he became the No.1 Contender to Progress Championship with a win over Dave Mastiff, but Dar was unable to unseat El Ligero for the title.

In 2014, Dar entered and won the first Progress World Cup tournament; representing Israel he defeated Darrell Allen (Jamaica), Grado (Scotland) and Rampage Brown (England). The tournament win earned him another shot at the Progress Championship against Jimmy Havoc. During the match, he made Havoc tap out but as the referee was knocked out at the time the decision didn't count and Havoc eventually won.

In 2015, at Chapter 18 Dar again challenged Havoc for the championship in a six-way elimination match. Dar eliminated Mastiff first, who then came back into the match and attacked Dar causing him to be eliminated too. He then entered the inaugural "Super Strong Style 16" tournament but was eliminated in the first round by Dave Mastiff due to referee stoppage and a storyline injury. The two were due to meet at Chapter 20, however travel issues prevented Mastiff from appearing and so Dar faced Pastor William Eaver and lost in what would become Dar's last Progress match.

Total Nonstop Action Wrestling (2014–2015) 
Dar was a contestant on Season 2 of Total Nonstop Action Wrestling's British Boot Camp which was televised nationally in the UK on Challenge TV. He advanced to the final six but the competition was eventually won by Mark Andrews.

Dar worked a handful of matches for TNA in the UK and US, most notably a loss on Xplosion to former TNA World Heavyweight Champion Austin Aries. As one of the final six, Dar accompanied TNA on their UK stadium tour where he was victorious in a pair of Tag Team matches and wrestled to a no-contest with Rampage Brown.

What Culture Pro Wrestling (2016) 
On 2 June 2016, Dar was announced to be a part of the What Culture Pro Wrestling roster. He wrestled his first match for the promotion against Rampage on the 4 July episode of Loaded, in which Dar lost via pinfall. On the 18 July episode of Loaded, he faced Joseph Conners in a winning effort. At WCPW Built To Destroy, he faced off against Jay Lethal for the ROH World Championship, but was defeated via pinfall. On the 8 August episode of Loaded, Dar faced off against Will Ospreay and El Ligero in a triple threat match. Ospreay emerged victorious, after an OsCutter on Dar.

On the 15 August episode of Loaded, Dar put his WCPW career on the line against Doug Williams for a chance to face Cody Rhodes in October, and after a controversial finish, Williams picked up the win, forcing Dar to leave WCPW.

WWE

Initial storylines (2016–2020) 
On 31 March 2016, Dar was announced as a participant in WWE's upcoming Global Cruiserweight Series tournament. The tournament, now renamed the "Cruiserweight Classic", began on June 23 with Dar defeating Gurv Sihra in his first round match. On 14 July, Dar defeated Ho Ho Lun in his second round match. On 26 August, Dar was eliminated from the tournament in the quarterfinals by Zack Sabre Jr. During the Cruiserweight Classic finale, Dar teamed with Cedric Alexander in a losing effort against Tommaso Ciampa and Johnny Gargano.

On the 22 August episode of Raw, Dar was announced as part of the upcoming cruiserweight division and had signed with WWE in the process. On the 7 November episode of Raw, Dar teamed with The Brian Kendrick in a losing effort against Rich Swann and Sin Cara in his main roster debut, which also was in his home country. On the 6 December episode of WWE 205 Live, Dar was victorious over Cedric Alexander. After the match, Dar cut a villainous promo, establishing himself as a heel in the process.

In early 2017, Dar began an on-screen relationship with Alicia Fox, who was involved in an on-screen relationship with Alexander. After two separate occasions in which Alexander was defeated by Dar, the two had a third match on the January 10 edition of 205 Live. Fox interfered in the match on behalf of Dar, allowing him to defeat Alexander once again, officially siding with Dar. Dar and Fox would subsequently accompany each other to their respective matches. At Fastlane, Dar teamed with Kendrick in a losing effort against Swann and Akira Tozawa.

After weeks of Fox receiving anonymous flowers (in which Dar would take credit for them), Swann revealed himself to be the sender on the 18 April edition of 205 Live. Fox chose to side with Swann, abandoning Dar. Dar and Fox reunited on the May 2 edition of 205 Live after Dar defeated Swann. The two would team together in a losing effort to Swann and Sasha Banks at Extreme Rules. Dar lost to a recently returning Alexander on the July 11 edition of 205 Live in an "I Quit" match. Following his loss, Dar broke up with Fox. In the later-half of 2017, Dar joined "The Zo Train," a faction consisting of Ariya Daivari, Drew Gulak, Tony Nese and WWE Cruiserweight Champion Enzo Amore.

On December 12, 2017, it was reported that Dar had suffered a knee injury and that he would require surgery. Dar underwent successful surgery to his left knee on 14 December to repair a tear in his meniscus, and despite not having a definitive timetable for returning, stated that it was "more than likely going to be around the five-month mark." On the June 20, 2018 tapings for WWE's United Kingdom Championship Tournament, Dar returned to action in a fatal four-way match, defeating Flash Morgan Webster, Mark Andrews and Travis Banks to become the number one contender for the WWE United Kingdom Championship.

On July 3, 2018, Dar made his return to 205 Live, defeating TJP. A week later, Dar had a rematch with TJP in a losing effort via submission. On his return, he began a brief feud with Lio Rush. Dar was supposed to face Rush on the September 19 episode of 205 Live, however Rush postponed the match for next week, which Rush won. On October 17, at the first episode of NXT UK, Dar unsuccessfully challenged Pete Dunne for the WWE United Kingdom Championship in the main event. Dar began a feud with Tony Nese, with the two exchanging victories and Nese attacking him in the parking lot. The feud ended however on the February 12, 2019 edition of 205 Live in a well-received No Disqualification match, in which Nese won.

On the March 13 episode of NXT UK, Dar turned heel by hating on the cruiserweights in NXT UK. Dar then offered Mark Andrews a handshake, then tried attacking Andrews who countered and sent Dar out of the ring. The following episode featured a match between Andrews and Dar that resulted in a no-contest. During the match, Dar injured his knee, which kept him out of action for almost two months. On April 19, he returned from injury at the NXT UK television tapings. At NXT UK TakeOver: Cardiff, Dar defeated Travis Banks in his first TakeOver match of any kind. After NXT UK's return from the Covid-19 pandemic, it was announced that Dar will be a part of the NXT UK Heritage Cup tournament. He defeated Alexander Wolfe in the first round of the tournament, with former NXT UK and NXT Tag Team Champion, Pete Dunne, as the  special guest referee. On the November 5, 2020, episode of NXT UK, Dar lost to eventual winner, A-Kid, in the second round of the Heritage Cup.

UK Heritage Cup Champion (2021–2022) 
In 2021, Dar started hosting his own talk show called "Supernova Sessions" and begun an on-screen association with real life friend Sha Samuels. On the October 7 episode of NXT UK, Dar defeated Wolfgang to become the next #1 Contender to the NXT UK Heritage Cup. On the October 28 episode of NXT UK, Dar defeated Tyler Bate 2-1 to win the NXT UK Heritage Cup Championship, winning his first championship in WWE in the process and becoming the first champion of Israeli descent in company history.

On the July 14 episode of NXT UK, Noam Dar lost the NXT Heritage Cup Championship to Mark Coffey with the match ending in the sixth round.

Noam Dar would go on to regain the NXT UK Heritage Cup Championship from Mark Coffey on the July 7 tapings of NXT UK.

Other media
Dar is a playable character in the video games WWE 2K18, WWE 2K19,  WWE 2K20 and WWE 2K23

Championships and accomplishments 
 British Championship Wrestling
 BCW Openweight Championship (1 time)
 Insane Championship Wrestling
 ICW World Heavyweight Championship (1 time)
 ICW Zero-G Championship (2 times)
 ICW Zero-G Title Tournament (2010)
 One Pro Wrestling
 1PW Openweight Championship (1 time)
 Preston City Wrestling
 PCW Cruiserweight Championship (1 time)
 PCW Heavyweight Championship (1 time)
 Road to Glory Tournament (2013)
 Premier British Wrestling
 PBW Tag Team Championship (1 time) – with Liam Thomson
 King of Cruisers (2012)
 Progress Wrestling
 Progress World Cup (2014)
 Pro Wrestling Elite
 PWE World Heavyweight Champion (1 time)
 Elite Rumble (2015, 2016)
 Pro Wrestling Illustrated
 Ranked No. 106 of the top 500 singles wrestlers in the PWI 500 in 2016
WWE
NXT UK Heritage Cup (2 times)
NXT UK Heritage Cup #1 Contender Tournament (2021)
 Wrestlers Reunion Scotland
 The George Kidd Scottish Wrestling Hall of Fame (2021)

See also
List of Jewish professional wrestlers

References

External links
 

1993 births
Living people
Sportspeople from Ayr
Scottish male professional wrestlers
Scottish people of Israeli descent
Scottish Jews
Jewish Israeli sportspeople
Jewish professional wrestlers
Israeli professional wrestlers
Israeli emigrants to the United Kingdom
21st-century professional wrestlers